Wes Davies (born 20 January 1978) is an English former professional rugby league and rugby union footballer, playing international level rugby league (RL) for Wales. At club level he played for the Wigan Warriors, Salford City Reds, Orrell R.U.F.C., Worcester Warriors, Doncaster Knights and the Cornish Pirates in the RFU Championship.

Background
Wes Davies was born in Wigan, Greater Manchester, England, he is the grandson of the rugby union and rugby league footballer; Billy Boston.

International honours
Davies played international rugby league for the Wales national rugby league team, and played at the 2000 Rugby League World Cup.

References

External links
(archived by web.archive.org) The Teams: Wales
Cornish Pirates profile

1978 births
Living people
Cornish Pirates players
Doncaster R.F.C. players
English rugby league players
English rugby union players
Footballers who switched code
Orrell R.U.F.C. players
Rugby league players from Wigan
Rugby league wingers
Rugby union players from Wigan
Salford Red Devils players
Wales national rugby league team players
Wigan Warriors players
Worcester Warriors players